The State Award System of the Russian Federation has varied and distinct origins. The first being pre-1917 orders of the Russian Empire re-established after the 1991 dissolution of the Soviet Union, the second is from former Soviet orders that were slightly modified and retained post 1991, we also find many completely new awards resembling Imperial awards in basic design since the reintroduction of Russian heraldry.

Some of the Soviet awards, decorations, and orders were discontinued after the dissolution of the Soviet Union, while others are still issued by the Russian Federation as of 2021. Many of the awards were simply reworked in the Russian Federation, such as the transition of Hero of the Soviet Union to Hero of the Russian Federation, and Hero of Socialist Labour to Hero of Labour of the Russian Federation.

Originally set up following the dissolution of the Soviet Union by Decision of the Supreme Soviet of the Russian Federation No. 2557-I of March 20, 1992, the statutes of all state awards was later ratified in Presidential Decree No. 442 of March 2, 1994.  The entire state awards' system of the Russian Federation was amended on September 7, 2010 by presidential decree No. 1099, this all encompassing decree distanced modern Russian awards from their Soviet roots.  Presidential Decree No. 1631 of December 16, 2011 amended and finalized the order of precedence of all modern Russian awards. Awards can be revoked by the State Duma if the recipient is not deemed fit to receive the award.

Honorary titles of the Russian Federation

Orders of the Russian Federation

State decorations of the Russian Federation

Medals of the Russian Federation

State commemorative medals of the Russian Federation
NOTE: Presidential Decree No. 1099 of September 7, 2010, states the following: "In order to improve the state award system of the Russian Federation that commemorative medals of the Russian Federation, awards established by federal authorities and other federal government agencies, public authorities of the Russian Federation, public and religious associations  were not state awards of the Russian Federation".  This serves to clarify who can be recommended for the higher state awards of the Russian Federation, many of them requiring the previous award of lower state awards to be eligible.  Commemorative awards and ministerial or departmental awards do not qualify as such.

Russian dynastic orders
Royal dynastic orders of the House of Romanov. Defunct since Soviet Union; conferred in exile.
Order of Saint Catherine
Order of Saint Alexander Nevsky
Order of the White Eagle
Order of Saint Vladimir
Order of Saint Anna
Order of Saint Nicholas the Wonderworker
Order of Saint Anastasia
Order of Saint Stanislaus
Order of Saint Michael the Archangel
 (Insignia of Saint Olga)

See also

Ministerial awards of the Russian Federation
List of awards of independent services of the Russian Federation
Awards and emblems of the Ministry of Defence of the Russian Federation
Awards of the Ministry for Emergency Situations of Russia
Awards of the Ministry of Internal Affairs of Russia
Awards of the Federal Border Service of the Russian Federation
Awards of the Federal Protective Service of the Russian Federation
Awards of the Federal Security Service of the Russian Federation
Honorary titles of Russia
List of Heroes of the Russian Federation
Orders, decorations, and medals of the Soviet Union
List of "Umalatova" awards
Russian nobility

References

External links 

 Official site of the Commission under the President of the Russian Federation on State Awards 
 Rossiyskaya Gazeta (Russian Gazette) 

 
Russia